Basdei is a village in India. It is located in Surajpur District of the state of Chhattisgarh. Surajpur district was declared a district on 15 August 2011 by the State Chief Minister Dr. Raman Singh along with eight other new districts. Basdei village was part of Surguja district earlier. This village is known in the region for Jawahar Navodaya Vidyalaya school.

References 

Villages in Surajpur district